"Together" is a 1967 song originally recorded and performed by The Intruders.  The song reached number 48 on the U.S. Billboard Hot 100 and spent nine weeks on the chart.  It was their second of 14 chart hits.

Tierra remake
In 1980, "Together" was a remake by Tierra. Their rendition reached number 18 on the U.S. Billboard Hot 100. The song spent five months on the chart. It was a number one record on Los Angeles radio.

Of note, both the Intruders' and Tierra's versions reached number nine on the U.S. R&B chart.

Other versions
Tirso Cruz III and Nora Aunor recorded a version of the song in 1971, released on their album Dream Come True.

Chart history

Weekly charts

Year-end charts

The Intruders original

Tierra cover

References

External links
 Lyrics of this song
 
 

1966 songs
1966 singles
1980 singles
The Intruders (band) songs
Songs written by Leon Huff
Songs written by Kenny Gamble